The Kerr-Booth House is a historic house at 611 West Center Avenue in Searcy, Arkansas.  It is a two-story wood-frame structure, finished in wooden clapboards and decorative cut shingles.  Its roof line is asymmetrical, with projecting gables and a recessed front porch supported by rusticated stone posts.  The house was built in 1890 as a Queen Anne Victorian, and was later altered to add Craftsman elements; it is an locally distinctive blend of these styles.

The house was listed on the National Register of Historic Places in 2006.

See also
National Register of Historic Places listings in White County, Arkansas

References

Houses on the National Register of Historic Places in Arkansas
Queen Anne architecture in Arkansas
Houses completed in 1890
Houses in Searcy, Arkansas
National Register of Historic Places in Searcy, Arkansas
American Craftsman architecture in Arkansas
1890 establishments in Arkansas